The Cardinia Creek is a freshwater stream southeast of Melbourne, Victoria that flows from the Cardinia Reservoir in the Dandenong Ranges into the Western Port Bay between Tooradin and Koo Wee Rup. The creek forms majority of the boundary between the local government areas of the City of Casey and the Shire of Cardinia. It runs through the town of Beaconsfield and is home to much native florae and faunae.

References 

Melbourne Water catchment
Rivers of Greater Melbourne (region)